Mount Tom State Park is a public recreation area lying south of US Route 202 in the towns of Washington, Litchfield, and Morris, Connecticut. The state park occupies  on the southwest shore of Mount Tom Pond and is home to the Mount Tom Tower, which was listed on the National Register of Historic Places in 1993. It is managed by the Connecticut Department of Energy and Environmental Protection.

History
The park is one of the oldest in the Connecticut state park system, having been among the 15 created between 1913 and 1918 by Connecticut's first State Park Commission. The park's land had been donated in 1911 for use as a state park by Charles H. Senff. Following Senff's death, his widow, Gustavia A. Senff, saw the transfer of the property through to completion, with the state legislature finalizing the action in 1917. It was the first to open.

Mount Tom Tower
A condition of the Senff gift was that a permanent observation tower be maintained at the summit of Mount Tom. The State Park Commission recommended that a stone tower be built to replace a wooden structure that had stood at the spot since 1888. The commission's secretary, Alfred M. Turner, drew up plans which were not closely followed. John DaRoss (John DaRoss & Sons) of Litchfield constructed the tower of rough black gneiss found at the site. Visitors can climb to the top for views that extend to Mount Everett in Massachusetts, the Catskills in New York, and Long Island Sound.

Geology
The park is notable for the presence of the metamorphic rocks gneiss and schist, the minerals quartz, garnet and hornblende, and boulders carried to the site by Ice Age glaciers.

Activities and amenities
The park offers fishing, swimming, and canoeing on  Mount Tom Pond, hiking the nearly one-mile-long loop trail that ascends Mount Tom to the observation tower, and picnicking.

See also
National Register of Historic Places listings in Litchfield County, Connecticut

References

External links

Mount Tom State Park Connecticut Department of Energy and Environmental Protection 
Mount Tom State Park Map Connecticut Department of Energy and Environmental Protection

State parks of Connecticut
Parks in Litchfield County, Connecticut
Litchfield, Connecticut
Washington, Connecticut
Morris, Connecticut
National Register of Historic Places in Litchfield County, Connecticut
Towers in Connecticut
Buildings and structures on the National Register of Historic Places in Connecticut
Protected areas established in 1915
1915 establishments in Connecticut